Al E. Cotey (19 March 1888 Chicago, Illinois – 27 October 1974 New Smyrna Beach, Florida) was an American racecar driver. He attempted to qualify for the Indianapolis 500 two times, in 1919 he did not qualify, while  in 1927 he qualified 29th with a speed of 106.295 mph.

Indianapolis 500 results

References

1888 births
1974 deaths
Indianapolis 500 drivers
Racing drivers from Chicago